Refael "Rafi" Dahan (born 28 September 1989) is a former Israeli footballer who last played for Bnei Yehuda Tel Aviv as a defensive midfielder.

Early life
Dahan was born in Or Akiva, Israel, to a Jewish family.

Career
Dahan grew up in the Beitar Nes Tubruk youth academy. In 2009, Hapoel Petah Tikva signed Dahan and by his second season with the club, Dahan had established himself as a first team player. In 2011, he signed with Maccabi Tel Aviv.

In March 2014, Maccabi Haifa F.C.'s Rubén Rayos committed a brutal tackle which resulted in an anterior cruciate ligament injury, forcing Dahan out for the remainder of the season; Rubén Rayos received a straight red card for his action.

After spending the next 12 months in recovery, Dahan was informed by his medical staff that his injury will not fully heal, forcing him to retire at age 25.

References

External links

1989 births
Living people
Israeli Jews
Israeli footballers
Beitar Nes Tubruk F.C. players
Hapoel Petah Tikva F.C. players
Maccabi Tel Aviv F.C. players
Bnei Yehuda Tel Aviv F.C. players
Israeli Premier League players
Liga Leumit players
Israeli people of Moroccan-Jewish descent
People from Or Akiva
Association football midfielders